The Tupolev Tu-107 was a prototype Soviet military transport aircraft developed from the Tupolev Tu-104. It featured a rear ramp loading door and was intended to carry light vehicles, artillery pieces, or up to 70 paratroopers. The fuselage was unpressurized, which meant that passengers would have to use oxygen masks. A single prototype was built and flown, but the aircraft was not put in production.

Specifications (Tu-107)

See also

References

 

Tu-0107
Abandoned military aircraft projects of the Soviet Union
1950s Soviet military transport aircraft
Twinjets
Aircraft first flown in 1958